James Steele Williams (1896–1957) was an American paleontologist  and stratigraphist.

In 1921, he began working as an Instructor of Geology at the University of Missouri, where he remained till 1930 when he got Associate Professor position. The same year he joined USGS as assistant, and later even succeeded George Herbert Girty, who was the specialist on late Paleozoic marine fauna. He also worked as a staff for Missouri Bureau of Mines and Geology. He died with a position of Principal Geologist.

References

1896 births
1957 deaths
20th-century American geologists
American paleontologists
University of Missouri faculty